Abramashvili is a Georgian surname. Notable people with the surname include:

Iason Abramashvili (born 1988), Georgian alpine skier
Nikolay Abramashvili (1918–1942), Soviet Georgian World War II flying ace

Georgian-language surnames
Patronymic surnames
Surnames from given names